Benton is a local service district that is partially within Carleton County and partially within York County in the Canadian province New Brunswick. Straddling the boundaries of two parishes – Woodstock and Canterbury – the local service district is divided into two designated places by Statistics Canada.

Demographics 

See also 
List of communities in New Brunswick
List of local service districts in New Brunswick

References 

Communities in Carleton County, New Brunswick
Communities in York County, New Brunswick
Designated places in New Brunswick
Local service districts of Carleton County, New Brunswick
Local service districts of York County, New Brunswick